The mixed Nacra 17 competition at the 2016 Summer Olympics in Rio de Janeiro took place between 10–16 August at Marina da Glória. Thirteen races (the last one a medal race) were held.

Schedule

Results

References

Further reading 
 
 

Mixed Nacra 17
Nacra 17 competitions
Mixed-sex sailing at the Summer Olympics
Mixed events at the 2016 Summer Olympics